The Musée historique (Historical museum) is one of the three museums of Haguenau, France. It was established in 1900 and inaugurated in 1905, when Haguenau was a German town and part of Alsace-Lorraine. In spite of its name, it is as much an art museum as a museum dedicated to History.

The museum was founded by the mayor, Xavier Nessel, who was also a keen amateur archaeologist. The building was initially designed to house the municipal collections, the municipal archive and the municipal library.

Apart from artefacts relating to the history of the town, including its Jewish community, the museum owns a rich collection of archaeological finds from the Neolithic, the Bronze Age, the Iron Age and the Gallo-Roman period. It also displays a number of Romanesque, Gothic, Renaissance and Baroque artworks from religious and secular buildings from the town and its surroundings; in many cases, those buildings themselves (such as Frederick Barbarossa's castle in Haguenau) have long disappeared. The museum also owns a collection of Strasbourg faience by the Hannong Family and a collection of modern art, including Art Nouveau glassware, and paintings.

The ethnographic and folk art collections relating to Alsace were moved to the Musée alsacien nearby in 1972.

Gallery

References

External links 

Website of the Musée historique

Museum
Museums in Bas-Rhin
History museums in France
Art museums and galleries in France
Museums established in 1900
Archaeological museums in France
Jewish museums in France
1900 establishments in Germany
Local museums in France